Mathías Sebastián Suárez Suárez (born 24 June 1996) is a Uruguayan professional footballer who plays as a right-back for  club Montpellier.

Club career
On 2 January 2019, Suárez officially signed with Montpellier until July 2023. Suárez made his debut on 3 February 2019 against rivals Nîmes. He was substituted at the half time break due to an injury. After a clash with Nîmes goalkeeper Paul Bernardoni, he broke three ribs and the estimated injury time was four weeks.

International career
Suárez made his debut for Uruguay national team on 16 November 2018 in a friendly against Brazil, as a starter.

Personal life
Suárez is the younger brother of Getafe right-back Damián Suárez.

Career statistics

International

Honours
Uruguay U22
 Pan American Games: 2015

References

External links
 
 

1996 births
Living people
Footballers from Montevideo
Association football defenders
Uruguayan footballers
Uruguay youth international footballers
Uruguay under-20 international footballers
Uruguay international footballers
Uruguayan Primera División players
Ligue 1 players
Defensor Sporting players
Montpellier HSC players
Montevideo City Torque players
2015 South American Youth Football Championship players
Pan American Games gold medalists for Uruguay
Footballers at the 2015 Pan American Games
Pan American Games medalists in football
Medalists at the 2015 Pan American Games
Uruguayan expatriate footballers
Uruguayan expatriate sportspeople in France
Expatriate footballers in France